Jean Aerts (8 September 1907 – 15 June 1992) was a Belgian road bicycle racer who specialized as a sprinter.  Aerts became the first man to win both the world amateur (1927) and professional (1935) road race championships.  In 1935, Aerts captured first place and the gold medal at the professional UCI Road World Championships in Floreffe, Belgium.

In 1927 professional and amateur riders rode concurrently at the Nürburgring in Germany and Aerts finished 5th, the highest ranked amateur. He also competed in three events at the 1928 Summer Olympics.

Although he lacked climbing ability for major tours, he used his sprinting ability to win 11 stages of the Tour de France, including six in 1933.

Major results

1927
  World Cycling Championships Road Race (Amateur)
  National Road Race Championship (Amateur)
1928
  National Road Race Championship (Amateur)
1929
 Volta a Catalunya
 Winner stages 1, 3, 4, 5 and 7
2nd place overall classification
Tour du Sud-Ouest
1930
Tour de France:
 Winner stage 6
1931
Paris–Brussels
1932
Tour de France
 13th place Overall classification
 Winner stage 1
1933
Tour of Belgium:
 Overall winner
 Winner stages 2, 3 and 5
Tour de France
 9th place Overall classification
 Winner stages 4, 15, 17, 19, 20 and 21
 1 stage Paris–Nice
1934
 1 stage Tour de Suisse
Paris - Boulogne-sur-Mer
1935
 World Cycling Championships Road Race
 Tour de France
 Winner stages 4, 8, 10 and 19
 29th place overall classification
Paris - Vichy
1936
  National Road Race Championship
1937
Six days of Brussels (with Omer De Bruycker)
Six days of Paris (with Omer De Bruycker)
1941
 national track stayers championships
1942
 national track stayers championships

References

External links

Official Tour de France results for Jean Aerts

1907 births
1992 deaths
Belgian male cyclists
Belgian Tour de France stage winners
UCI Road World Champions (elite men)
People from Laeken
Tour de Suisse stage winners
Olympic cyclists of Belgium
Cyclists at the 1928 Summer Olympics
Cyclists from Brussels